Teuzzone is the twelfth Italian opera composed by Antonio Vivaldi in 1719 to a libretto by Apostolo Zeno of 1706, which was first performed at the Teatro Arciducale in Mantua.

Roles

Synopsis

The plot concerns the aftermath of Troncone's death, where his wife Zidiana schemes with the governor Cino and the general Sivenio to seize power, even though Teuzzone is the rightful heir. Zelinda, the fiancée of Teuzzone, is a powerful woman in her own right and fights against this move, especially when it becomes clear that Zidiana's plan is to marry Teuzzone for herself.

Recordings

Conductor: Sandro Volta. Orchestra dell'Opera Barocca di Guastalla. Singers: Pagano, Barazzoni, Bortolanei, Piccini, Lippi, Favari, Manzotti. Date: 1996. Issued: 1996.

Conductor: Jordi Savali. Le Concert des Nations. Singers: Lopez, Milanesi, Galou, Mameli, Zanasi, Giovannini, Sakurada.  Label: Naive. Issued: 2011.

External links 
 Teuzzone summary and cast list (in Italian and English)
 Libretto 

Operas
Operas by Antonio Vivaldi
1719 operas
Operas set in China
Italian-language operas